Malin Dinah Sundström (born 23 August 1980), better known by her stage name Dinah Nah, is a Swedish singer. She began her career in 1998, as a member of the pop group Caramell. She later launched a solo career in 2015, placing twelfth in Melodifestivalen 2015 with the song "Make Me (La La La)", which became a top ten hit in Sweden. She also competed in Melodifestivalen 2017 with the song "One More Night", failing to qualify from the first semi-final.

Life and career

Early life and Caramell
Dinah Nah was born as Malin Dinah Sundström and grew up in the Sätra district of Stockholm, Sweden.  She is a licensed skin therapist and nurse. She was also a member of the pop group Caramell, until the group disbanded in 2002.

Solo career
Dinah Nah launched her solo career when Anders Bagge approached her to sing the song "Make Me (La La La)" in Melodifestivalen 2015. She participated in the fourth semi-final, placing fourth and qualifying to andra chansen. She qualified through to the final through andra chansen, and placed last out of twelve. She subsequently released the song "Taste Your Love".

She competed in Melodifestivalen 2017 with the song "One More Night". She participated in the first semi-final held on 4 February 2017, placing fifth and didn't qualify to the finals.

Discography

Singles

References

External links 

Swedish pop singers
Swedish dance musicians
Singers from Stockholm
English-language singers from Sweden
Living people
1980 births
21st-century Swedish singers
21st-century Swedish women singers
Melodifestivalen contestants of 2017
Melodifestivalen contestants of 2015